Van Jaarsveld is an Afrikaans surname. Notable people with the surname include:

Bobby van Jaarsveld (born 1987), South African singer
Martin van Jaarsveld (born 1974), South African cricketer
Torsten van Jaarsveld (born 1987), South African rugby union player
Vaughn van Jaarsveld (born 1985), South African cricketer

Afrikaans-language surnames
Surnames of Dutch origin